Bjärsjölagård Castle is a former mansion in Sjöbo Municipality, Scania, Sweden.

History
The main building from 1766 and the north wing from 1777 are in Rococo architectural style.  They were designed by architect Jean Eric Rehn (1717-1793). The south wing dates from 1812 and was designed in Empire style. 
Since 1958, the manor has   functioned as a conference facility and has been a popular place for weddings and other gatherings.

See also
List of castles in Sweden

References

External links
Bjärsjölagård slott website

Castles in Skåne County
Manor houses in Sweden